Bonai State, was a princely state during the British Raj in what is today India. It was one of the Chota Nagpur States and had its capital at Bonaigarh, located in the present-day Sundergarh district of Odisha.

History

Origins of the Kadamba dynasty of Bonai
As per legends, the founders of the dynasty claimed numerous obscure origins but lack of written archival records dispute them as untenable due to the mythical legends which shrouds the ancestry of the founding clans. Most research into the origins of the dynasty points that the founders of the Bonai State belonged to the head of the Bhuyan clans of the region which was later acquired mythical characteristics.

The founding of the Bonai State led to the establishment of the Kadamba dynasty, named after the flowers of the Kadamba tree (Neolamarckia cadamba) which is also present in the founding legendary myths of the dynasty and also remains the symbol of one of its collateral branch of Athmallik State. The Kadamba tree also plays a central element in the legends of the dominant Bhuyan clans of the region demonstrating the close relationship that the clans play in the royal traditions and rituals of the dynasty. Reconstruction of the court records points that the founder of the dynasty Pratap Bhanu Deo founded the State with the help of local Bhuyan landlords and subjugated the region. The local Bhuyan landlords maintained a strong presence at the royal court, administrative levels and socio-religious traditions of the kingdom.

Modern period
During the reign of Raja Dayanidhi Chandra Deo, the region formally became a part of the British Empire after the defeat of the Marathas in the Second Anglo-Maratha War. The princely states of Athmallik and Rairakhol also share descent with the Bonai State being collateral branches of the Kadamba dynasty.

On 1 January 1948 the last ruler of Bonai signed the accession to the Indian Union after independence and following which it merged with the state of Odisha forming a part of the Sundergarh district.

Rulers
The rulers of the Bonai State of Kadamba dynasty:

Pratap Bhanu Deo
...
Dayanidhi Chandra Deo (1804–1851)
Chandra Deo (1851–12 September1876)
Indra Deo (12 September 1876 – 1898)
Nilambar Chandra Deo (1898 – 19 February 1902)
Dharani Dhar Deo (19 February 1902 – 1 January 1948)

Titular
Dharani Dhar Deo (1948)
Kadamba Keshari Chandra Deo (1948 – 17 December 2002)
Bir Keshari Deo (17 December 2002 – current)

See also
Eastern States Agency
Chota Nagpur States

References

Princely states of Odisha
History of Odisha
Sundergarh district
16th-century establishments in India
1948 disestablishments in India
States and territories disestablished in 1948